Sivi may refer to:
SIVI, an Italian truck modification company
Sivi (film), 2007 Indian Tamil horror film
Sivi Kingdom, a kingdom mentioned in the ancient Indian epic Mahabharata

See also
 Shibi (disambiguation)
 Shivi, Iran (disambiguation)
 Sibi (disambiguation)